Sarbhog {IPA:ˈsə(r)ˌbɒg} (also spelt as Sorbhog) is a town and a town area committee in Barpeta district in the Indian state of Assam. It is located on the banks of river Beki and is known for the century-old temple of lord Krishna known as "Gorokhiya Gohainr Than" where thousands of pilgrims visit on auspicious occasions to have a glimpse of this holy place. Sorbhog is well connected by roads and trains to all the surrounding areas. The National Highway 31 connects Sorbhog with the rest of India.

Geography

History
The name suggests that there is abundance of milk and milk products in this town, and it is true. Sorbhog is famous for the milk cream and curd produced locally. Outsiders find it very interesting to shop around the town and buy tasty and mouth watering milk products. Sorbhog is the hub for the greater "Barnagar" area. The name "Barnagar" means a great place. It was Koch King Naranarayan who founded Barnagar. The present Barpeta District formed an integral part of the Koch-Hajo till British Administration took over. From the ancient period, Barpeta witnessed the rule of the Varmans, (380-654) the Salasthamas, (655-985) the Palas, (985-1260) the Kamatas (1260–1509) & the Koches from 1509. During the Kamata & Koch rule, major historical development took place. During this period, a large number of local feudatory-chiefs, who are primarily land lords called 'Bhuyans', ruled the region. Number of villages constituted a 'Chakla' placed under a Bhuyan was patronised by the Kamatas. These Bhuyans arrived from eastern part of India like Kanauj, Gauda and Bengal who in passage of time became general Assamese caste and accepted the Vaishnava faith under influence of Shrimanta Sankardeva.

Demographics
 India census, Sorbhog had a population of 7553. Males constitute 51% of the population and females 49%. Sorbhog has an average literacy rate of 78%, higher than the national average of 59.5%: male literacy is 83%, and female literacy is 72%. In Sorbhog, 10% of the population is under 6 years of age.

Politics
Sorbhog is part of Kokrajhar (Lok Sabha constituency).

References

Cities and towns in Barpeta district
Villages in Barpeta district